Sunshine Beach State High School is a coeducational independent public secondary school based in Sunshine Beach in the local government area of the Shire of Noosa on the Sunshine Coast in Queensland, Australia. The school has a total enrolment of more than 1200 students per year, with an official count of 1279 students in 2017.

Sunshine Beach State High School's current role of Principal is held by Grant Williams. The school also consists of four Deputy Principals, one Business Services Manager, thirteen Heads of Department (one of which also holds one of the Deputy Principal roles), six Heads of Year, two Guidance Officers and one School-based Health Nurse.

History

Extracurricular activities

Extracurricular activities available to students at Sunshine Beach State High School include:
 Cheerleading program
 Duke of Edinburgh Award
 English activities
 Debating
 Literary Festivals
 Public speaking competitions
 Spelling bees
 Writing competitions
 Writing workshops
 Sports activities
 Carnivals
 Excellence in Surfing
 Touch Football
 Triathlon
 Water Polo
 Music Programs
 Classroom Music Program
 Performance Music Program
 Years 7, 8 and 9 Music Excellence class

References

External links
 

Public high schools in Queensland
Schools on the Sunshine Coast, Queensland
Educational institutions established in 1992
1992 establishments in Australia